Grand Reef Airport  is an airport serving the city of Mutare, in Manicaland Province, Zimbabwe.

The Grand Reef non-directional beacon (Ident: GR) is located on the field.

See also
Transport in Zimbabwe
List of airports in Zimbabwe

References

External links
Grand Reef Airport
Mutare Grand Reef
OpenStreetMap - Grand Reef

Airports in Zimbabwe
Buildings and structures in Manicaland Province
Mutare District